The 1948–49 Western Kentucky State Hilltoppers men's basketball team represented Western Kentucky State College (now known as Western Kentucky University) during the 1948-49 NCAA University Division Basketball season. The Hilltoppers were led by future Naismith Memorial Basketball Hall of Fame coach Edgar Diddle and All-American guard John Oldham.  This was the inaugural season for the newly established Ohio Valley Conference and Western Kentucky won the conference championships, and appeared in the 1949 National Invitation Tournament.   During this period, the NIT was considered by many to be the premiere college basketball tournament, with the winner being recognized as the national champion.  Oldham and Center Bob Lavoy were named to the All-Conference team as well as the OVC All-Tournament team.  This was the first year that a widely distributed, national poll was published by the Associated Press, and Western Kentucky was ranked 3rd in the initial poll and finished the season ranked 5th.

Schedule

|-
!colspan=6| Regular Season

|-

 

|-
!colspan=6| 1949 Ohio Valley Conference Tournament

|-
!colspan=6| 1949 National Invitation Tournament

References

Western Kentucky Hilltoppers basketball seasons
Western Kentucky State
Western Kentucky State
Western Kentucky State Basketball, Men's
Western Kentucky State Basketball, Men's